Beania is a genus of bryozoans belonging to the family Beaniidae.

The genus has cosmopolitan distribution.

Species
Species:

Beania admiranda 
Beania alaskensis 
Beania americana 
Beania aspinosa 
Beania asymmetrica 
Beania australis 
Beania australopacifica 
Beania bermudezi 
Beania bilaminata 
Beania carteri 
Beania challengeri 
Beania clavata 
Beania columbiana 
Beania conferta 
Beania cookae 
Beania correiae 
Beania costata 
Beania cribrimorpha 
Beania crotali 
Beania cupulariensis 
Beania cylindrica 
Beania decumbens 
Beania diademata 
Beania discodermiae 
Beania distans 
Beania elongata 
Beania erecta 
Beania farreae 
Beania fragilis 
Beania gigantavicularis 
Beania hexaceras 
Beania hexamicorum 
Beania hirtissima 
Beania hyadesi 
Beania inermis 
Beania intermedia 
Beania klugei 
Beania lagenula 
Beania livingstonei 
Beania magellanica 
Beania maxilla 
Beania maxilladentata 
Beania mediterranea 
Beania metrii 
Beania minuspina 
Beania mirabilis 
Beania mirabilissima 
Beania multispinosa 
Beania octaceras 
Beania paucispinosa 
Beania pectinata 
Beania petiolata 
Beania plurispinosa 
Beania proboscidea 
Beania pseudocolumbiana 
Beania pulchella 
Beania quadricornuta 
Beania rediviva 
Beania regularis 
Beania scotti 
Beania serrata 
Beania spinigera 
Beania stonycha 
Beania superhispida 
Beania thula 
Beania trampida 
Beania uniarmata 
Beania vanhoeffeni 
Beania vegae 
Beania wilsoni

References

Bryozoan genera